The men's decathlon event at the 1999 Pan American Games was held July 24–25.

Results

References

Athletics at the 1999 Pan American Games
1999